Omphalophloios is a genus of fossil lycopsid trees in the Carboniferous system.

References

Carboniferous plants
Prehistoric lycophyte genera